Phoeby Okech Owiti (born 10 October 1994) is a Kenyan professional footballer, who plays as a midfielder for Turkish Women's Football Super League club Hakkarigücü Spor and the Kenya women's national team.

Club career 
End January 2023, 
End January 2023, Okech moved to Turkey, and signed with Hakkarigücü Spor to play in the 2022-23 Women's Super Leagıue.

International career 
Okech made her debut for the team in a 2022 African Cup of Nations qualifiers against South Sudan.

See also 
List of Kenya women's international footballers

References

External links 
 
 

1994 births
Living people
Kenyan women's footballers
Women's association football midfielders
Kenya women's international footballers
Expatriate footballers in Kenya
Kenyan expatriate sportspeople in Turkey
Expatriate women's footballers in Turkey
Turkish Women's Football Super League players
Hakkarigücü Spor players